The 2004 Mercedes Cup was a tennis tournament played on outdoor clay courts at the Tennis Club Weissenhof in Stuttgart, Germany and was part of the International Series Gold of the 2004 ATP Tour. The tournament ran from July 12 through July 18, 2004. Guillermo Cañas won the singles title.

Finals

Singles

 Guillermo Cañas defeated  Gastón Gaudio 5–7, 6–2, 6–0, 1–6, 6–3
 It was Cañas' 1st title of the year and the 4th of his career.

Doubles

 Jiří Novák /  Radek Štěpánek defeated  Simon Aspelin /  Todd Perry 6–2, 6–4
 It was Novák's 1st title of the year and the 16th of his career. It was Štěpánek's 2nd title of the year and the 8th of his career.

References

External links
 Official website 
 ITF tournament edition details
 ATP tournament profile

Stuttgart Open
Stuttgart Open
2004 in German tennis